Samaipata may refer to:
Samaipata, Bolivia
El Fuerte de Samaipata